Víctor Moro Rodríguez (25 April 1926 – 15 December 2021) was a Spanish politician who served as a member of the Congress of Deputies from 1977 to 1979. Moro died on 15 December 2021, at the age of 95.

References

1926 births
2021 deaths
Members of the constituent Congress of Deputies (Spain)
Spanish economists
Politicians from Galicia (Spain)
People from A Mariña Oriental